Communist Revolution Movement/Leninist is a clandestine communist organization in Turkey. KDH/L was founded in 1999, following a split from the Communist Revolution Movement (KDH). KDH/L accused KDH of opportunism.

KDH/L publishes Proleter Devrimci KöZ.

The legal front of KDH/L is the Revolutionary Party Forces/Leninist.

External links
Leninist Light - Periodical of KDH/L
KDH/L website
Proleter Devrimci KöZ

1999 establishments in Turkey
Clandestine groups
Communist organizations in Turkey
Far-left politics in Turkey
Organizations established in 1999